Johannson is a surname. Notable people with the surname include:

Hartvig Johannson (1875–1957), Norwegian businessman
Jim Johannson (1964–2018), American ice hockey player, coach and executive
Johan Johannson (1881–1958), Norwegian businessman
Johan Johannson (1911–2004), Norwegian businessman
Johan Johannson (1967) (born 1967), Norwegian businessman
John Johannson (born 1961), American ice hockey player
Johan Johannson (1881–1958), Norwegian businessman
Ken Johannson (1930–2018), Canadian-born American ice hockey player, coach and executive
Knut Hartvig Johannson (born 1937), Norwegian politician
Rune B. Johansson (1915–1982), Swedish politician 
Wally Johannson (born 1936), Canadian politician

See also
Johanson
Johansson
Jóhannsson